Art Gallery of Uzbekistan is established in Tashkent city, after the Independence of Republic Uzbekistan, and became one of the most visited modern museums of local people in Uzbekistan.

About 
Art Gallery of Uzbekistan is one of the youngest museums of Uzbekistan as it was established after the Independence of the Republic. It first opened for visitors in August 2004. However, its history goes back to 1994 when the President of Uzbekistan, Islam Karimov set up a fine art collection amassed by the National Bank for Foreign Economic Activity of Uzbekistan. When the exhibits in the Bank gallery increased rapidly, the government decided to open a full-fledged exhibition hall, which after some time became the Art Gallery of Uzbekistan. 

Nowadays, the Art Gallery of Uzbekistan is one of the most modern museums of Uzbekistan and it is equipped with all the necessities to store and display the pictures. The Gallery was reconstructed and received its new look in a short period of time after its establishment.

The exhibition area of the Art Gallery of Uzbekistan is estimated to be 3,500 square meters, with 15 rooms. Meanwhile, there is a conference room, lecture hall, small cinema hall, library and studio to hold masterclasses, and workshops. There are cafeterias and small gift shops at the main building of the Gallery.

Instead of only showing its own stands and exponents, the gallery also receives some international and local exhibitions, and some cultural events.

Location 
Art Gallery of Uzbekistan is located in Buyuk Turon street, Tashkent city, Uzbekistan. It is open to the public for 6 hours every day except Sunday and Monday.

See also 

State Museum of History of Uzbekistan
The Museum of Health Care of Uzbekistan
The Museum of Communication History in Uzbekistan
Museum of Arts of Uzbekistan
Tashkent Museum of Railway Techniques
Museum of Geology, Tashkent
Tashkent Polytechnical Museum
The Alisher Navoi State Museum of Literature
Museum of Victims of Political Repression in Tashkent
State Museum of Nature of Uzbekistan
Tashkent Planetarium

References

External links
Small piece of information about the gallery in English – sambuh.com
Brochure about the gallery 
Small piece of information about the gallery

Museums in Tashkent
Art museums and galleries in Uzbekistan